Soy refers to soybean, a species of legume native to East Asia (soya).

Soy may also refer to:

Food products
 Soy sauce, a fermented sauce made from soybeans
 Soy milk, a beverage made from soybeans
 Soy protein, protein derived from soybeans

Music
 Soy (Alejandra Guzmán album), the tenth studio album by Alejandra Guzmán 
 Soy (Cynthia album), the debut album by Cynthia
 Soy (Debi Nova album), second studio album by Debi Nova
 Soy (Ednita Nazario album), the 20th studio album Ednita Nazario
 Soy (Julio Iglesias album) by Julio Iglesias
 Soy (Lali Espósito album), by Lali
 "Soy" (song), by Lali
 Soy Tour, a world tour by Lali
 Soy (Victor Manuelle album), by Victor Manuelle

Languages
 One of the Romance copula forms, using ser from Spanish (first person, "I am".)

Other uses
 Soy templates, a web templating language that is part of the Google Closure Tools system
 Soy, a village in the municipality of Érezée
 SOY, the IATA code for Stronsay Airport in the United Kingdom

See also

Soya (disambiguation)
 Soja (disambiguation)
 Soia (disambiguation)
 Soi (disambiguation)
 SOJ (disambiguation)